The 1969 Lehigh Engineers football team was an American football team that represented Lehigh University during the 1969 NCAA College Division football season, and completed the 86th season of Engineers football. Lehigh finished fourth in the Middle Atlantic Conference, University Division, and won the Middle Three Conference championship.

The 1969 team came off a 3–7 record from the previous season. The team was led by coach Fred Dunlap. The team finished the regular season with a 4–5–1 record. Mike Leib and Pete Tomaino were the team captains.

To kick off its conference schedule, Lehigh scored a significant upset against Rutgers, dealing the Scarlet Knights their first loss during college football's centennial season, the 100th anniversary of the 1869 game between Rutgers and Princeton that is considered the sport's first intercollegiate matchup. Dunlap compared the 17-7 victory to Lehigh's best season in recent memory: "We beat Columbia, Colgate and Harvard in 1961, our Lambert Cup year and this is the greatest football triumph for us since then."

The Engineers beat both of their Middle Three rivals, Rutgers and Lafayette, to win the conference championship. The Engineers were 2–2 against MAC University Division opponents, earning fourth place in that conference.

Lehigh played its home games at Taylor Stadium on the university campus in Bethlehem, Pennsylvania.

Schedule

References

Lehigh
Lehigh
Lehigh Mountain Hawks football seasons
Lehigh Engineers football